John Simpson "Johnny" Dowson (18 September 1926 – 1989) was an English footballer who scored 11 goals from 65 appearances in the Football League playing on the wing for Darlington in the 1950s. He was on the books of Manchester City, but never played for them in the League, scored 39 goals from 68 appearances in the Midland League for Peterborough United, and also played non-league football for Ashington.

References

1926 births
1989 deaths
Sportspeople from Ashington
Footballers from Northumberland
English footballers
Association football wingers
Manchester City F.C. players
Peterborough United F.C. players
Darlington F.C. players
Ashington A.F.C. players
Midland Football League players
English Football League players
Date of death missing
Place of death missing